Vicente de Soliveres y Miera (ca. 1838 – ca. 1908) was Mayor of Ponce, Puerto Rico, from 4 April 1888 to 19 March 1889.

Background
Soliveres Miera had been mayor of San Juan before he was appointed mayor of Ponce.

Mayoral term
Upon taking over as mayor, he announced the 16 Ponce residents chosen by the Governor who would make up the Municipal Council: Ramón Cortada, F. Marzan, P. Valdivieso, Miguel Rosich, Francisco Roubert, Basilio O. Diaz, Angel Fernandez, F. Fernandez, Narciso Arabia, Juan Serrallés, Pedro Hedilla, Santiago Oppenheimer, B. Garcia, Lazaro Puente, Jose Mirandes, Jaime Cotal, Francisco Barnes, Cosme Clavell, A. Subira, Jose Ferrer.

Soliveres Miera is best remembered for shutting down the newspaper La Revista de Puerto Rico in July 1888. Two months later, on 1 September 1888, strong rains caused Río Portugués to overflow its banks, and Soliveres help the victims of the floods. Soliveres Miera also oversaw the "Hermanas de la Caridad" (Sisters of the Charity) taking charge of the administration of the municipal hospital, Hospital Tricoche. Some of the public works by Soliveres are the building of a new municipal jail and of a concrete tower at Cerro del Vigía, the enlargement of the municipal offices, improvements made to the exiting jail to provide for living quarters for the prison officer, and the provisioning of sidewalks to several city streets.

Resignation
Soliveres was liked by his employees and subordinates, "their relationship being more that of a friend than a boss." 
However, one night, upon orders from the governor, Soliveres dissolved the tertulia at Parque de Bombas because, it was rumored, that in it the provincial government was being criticized. From that point on the news media followed, analyzed and reported all his moves to the point the criticism became too much of a burden on the mayor. As a result, he presented his resignation to the governor and left for Spain. Still liked by many of the townspeople, Soliveres was wished a warm farewell along the way as he left the city and traveled the municipal portion of Carretera Central to San Juan.

References

Notes

See also

List of mayors of Ponce, Puerto Rico
List of Puerto Ricans

Further reading
 Fay Fowlie de Flores. Ponce, Perla del Sur: Una Bibliografía Anotada. Second Edition. 1997. Ponce, Puerto Rico: Universidad de Puerto Rico en Ponce. p. 336. Item 1673. 
 Ponce. Reglamento para el régimen interior de las oficinas del ilustre Ayuntamiento y Alcaldía de la Ciudad, aprobado por dicha Corporación en la sesión del día 6 de junio de 1888. Ponce, Puerto Rico: Tip. de la "Revista de Puerto Rico", 1888. (Universidad de Puerto Rico, Rio Piedras; Colegio Universitario Tecnológico de Ponce, CUTPO [fotocopia])

Mayors of Ponce, Puerto Rico
1830s births
1900s deaths
Year of birth uncertain
Year of death uncertain